The Seattle–Bainbridge ferry is a ferry route across Puget Sound between Seattle and Bainbridge Island, Washington.  The route was called the Seattle–Winslow ferry before the city of Winslow annexed the rest of the island and changed its name.  Since 1951 the only ferries employed on the route have belonged to the Washington state ferry system, currently the largest ferry system in the United States.

Description
Next to the Winslow terminal is Eagle Harbor, the main shipyard for the Washington State Ferry system.

History
Before ferries were dominant on Puget Sound, the route was served by passenger and freight-carrying steamboats.  The wooden steamship Florence K served the route for the Eagle Harbor Transportation Co., until 1915 when the company put the new steamer Bainbridge on the route, and shifted Florence K to the Seattle–Port Washington route.

In 1949, the Chippewa served on the route, except during summers, when the Chippewa was transferred to the  Anacortes-San Juan Islands-Sidney route.  From 1951 to 1968, the main ferry on the route was the Illahee which ran along with the Quinault (1951–1953), Evergreen State (1954–1959), and Tillikum (1959–1968), with the steam ferry San Mateo occasionally running as an extra boat.

In 1950, the Agate Pass Bridge opened, connecting the north end of Bainbridge Island to the Kitsap Peninsula. The bridge and ferry proved to be a faster option to travel between many parts of the Olympic Peninsula and Seattle, compared to the Seattle–Bremerton ferry route. 

By 1968, demand on the Bainbridge Island ferry was exceeding vehicle capacity, so the Tillikum and Illahee were reassigned to the Edmonds–Kingston ferry, and replaced by the Super-class vessels Kaleetan and Elwha, both of which had capacities of 2,500 passengers and 160 automobiles. About five years later, in 1972–1973, the Super-class vessels were displaced by the larger Jumbo-class ferries Spokane and Walla Walla, which had a lower passenger capacity of 2,000 passengers, but room for 206 automobiles (later downrated to 188 vehicles). The Jumbo-class ferries remained in Bainbridge Island service for more than two decades until they were displaced in turn by the even larger Jumbo Mark-II-class vessels, the Tacoma and Wenatchee in 1997–1998, which returned a passenger capacity of 2,500 and a maximum of 202 vehicles.

See also
 Ferries in Washington State

Notes

References
 Demoro, Harre, The Evergreen Fleet – A Pictorial History of Washington State Ferries, Golden West Books, San Marino CA (1971) 
 Kline, Mary S., and Bayless, G.A., Ferryboats – A Legend on Puget Sound, Bayless Books, Seattle (1983) 
 Newell, Gordon R. ed., H.W. McCurdy Marine History of the Pacific Northwest,  Superior Publishing, Seattle WA (1966)

External links
 

Ferry routes in western Washington (state)
Transportation in King County, Washington
Water transport in Seattle
History of King County, Washington
Transportation in Kitsap County, Washington
History of Kitsap County, Washington
Bainbridge Island, Washington